The honour of Pontefract, also known as the feudal barony of Pontefract, was an English feudal barony. Its origins lie in the grant of a large, compact set of landholdings in Yorkshire, made between the Norman conquest of England in 1066 and the completion of the Domesday Survey in 1086. An expansive set of landholdings spanning sixty parishes and six wapentakes in Yorkshire, the honour was created primarily to serve a strategic, defensive function in a potentially hostile frontier zone. The first lord was Ilbert de Lacy, who built a castle at Pontefract which became the caput of the honour. Alongside the Yorkshire holdings, a smaller number of dispersed possessions elsewhere in England belonged to the honour.

After Lacy's death, his son succeeded him as lord before having the honour confiscated some time before c. 1116, after which it was regranted twice. Ilbert de Lacy's grandson recovered a two-thirds share in c. 1135, which passed through his heirs, then to a collateral branch in 1193; the final third share was reunited with the rest of the honour in 1205. In 1311, the honour was inherited by an heiress, Alice, who married Thomas, 2nd Earl of Lancaster. After the earl's failed rebellion in 1322, the honour was confiscated and entered a period of royal ownership which ended in 1348 with a grant to Thomas's great-nephew, Henry of Grosmont, 4th Earl (later 1st Duke) of Lancaster. His daughter and heiress Blanche brought it through marriage to John of Gaunt, who was also created Duke of Lancaster. After Gaunt died in 1399, his son and heir Henry of Bolingbroke, was denied access to his Lancastrian inheritance (including the honour of Pontefract) by Richard II; Henry seized the throne (as Henry IV) and retook the lands which had belonged to his father, after which the honour formed part of the Duchy of Lancaster, which has ever since been private property of the English monarch.

History

Origins 
Ilbert de Lacy was a Norman landowner of obscure origins. After the Norman conquest of England which commenced in 1066, William the Conqueror gave Lacy a large fief in the English county of Yorkshire, which formed the basis of the honour. The exact date of the honour's foundation is unclear; the historian W. E. Wightman suggested it was soon before 1086, but more recent studies (including those by the historian Sarah Rose) support the thesis that the first grants to Lacy may have taken place in the 1070s and were supplemented thereafter, finally with the royal manor of Tanshelf, which may have been granted shortly before the Domesday Survey (1086). The honour was established by the time of Domesday's completion – and substantial in size: it took up 141 entries in the survey's returns. In the historian David Carpenter's words, the fief "formed a compact block stretching from Elland and Golcar ... to Brayton ..., from Grimston Grange and Thorner ... to Hunshelf Hall ... surrounding the [royal manor of] Wakefield". The honour, which spanned approximately sixty parishes, six wapentakes and over 500 square miles, was deliberately created as a territorially compact unit: it was created primarily to serve a strategic function as a defensive bulwark in an important border zone. Lacy established a castle at Pontefract (in the former royal manor of Tanshelf), which became the caput of this honour. He died during the reign of King William II. His son and heir, Robert de Lacy, succeeded to the honour.

c. 1115–c. 1135: Forfeiture 
Robert de Lacy was banished from England some time between 1109 and 1115 or 1116. His English estates were confiscated by the king and the honour of Pontefract was granted to Hugh de Laval, who the historian Janet Burton describes as "a Norman baron of secondary status". After Laval died c. 1129, the honour of Pontefract's sixty knight's fees were divided into three equal portions. William Maltravers paid £1,000 for the reversion of Laval's estate for the term of 15 years, as well as £100 to marry Laval's widow and take possession of her marriage portion and dower. Laval's widow brought two thirds of the honour to Maltravers, while the remaining third (consisting of 20 knight's fees) was inherited by Laval's son, Guy de Laval.

c. 1135–1311: Return to the Lacy family 
Maltravers was killed in 1135 shortly after the accession of King Stephen; afterwards, Robert de Lacy's son Ilbert II de Lacy was granted Maltravers' share of the honour of Pontefract and received a royal pardon for his men's role in Maltravers' death. Guy de Laval and his successors retained the other part of the honour, which consisted mostly of the honour's outlying lands in Lincolnshire and Oxfordshire. Ilbert II disappears from the historical record around 1141; his brother Henry de Lacy succeeded him in the honour of Pontefract. Gilbert de Gant, Earl of Lincoln, disputed Henry de Lacy's right to the honour (possibly because Gant's sister was Ilbert de Lacy's widow). The dispute was resolved through armed conflict, with Lacy retaining possession of the honour and Gant paying compensation to Prior of Pontefract for leaving the priory in ruins. After Henry II succeeded to the throne in 1154, he confirmed Lacy's possession and pardoned the family for supporting Stephen during The Anarchy. Lacy died in 1177.

Henry de Lacy's heir was his son Robert de Lacy, who died childless in 1193. Robert bequeathed his lands to his cousin Aubrey de Lisours. In 1194, she settled the honour of Pontefract on her grandson, Roger, who took the surname de Lacy. Five years later, Roger offered 500 marks to take possession of the Laval share of the honour of Pontefract, which was held by another Guy de Laval, though he did not recover possession immediately. In 1205, after Guy had taken up arms against him, King John granted the Laval share to Roger de Lacy, thus reuniting the whole of the honour. Lacy died in 1211 and his son John received livery of the inheritance two years later. He became Earl of Lincoln in 1232 and died in 1240. His heir was his son Edmund, who was a minor; during his minority, his lands were placed under the guardianship of his mother, Margaret de Quincy, who remarried to Walter Marshal, 5th Earl of Pembroke. Edmund took possession of his inheritance, including the honour of Pontefract, in 1248. He died ten years later, leaving a son, Henry, as his heir. Henry was also a minor and his mother Alicia was awarded the guardianship of his lands. He came of age in 1272.

1311–1399: Lancastrian and royal ownership 
After both of his sons had died, Henry de Lacy resigned the honour of Pontefract to the king in 1292. The king regranted them to him and the heirs of his body with remainder to the king's brother Edmund, 1st Earl of Lancaster, and the heirs of his body; this effectively gave Lacy a life interest in the honour. In 1294, he regranted a life interest in the honour to himself, but this time with remainder to Edmund's son, Thomas, 2nd Earl of Lancaster, who had married Lacy's daughter and heiress, Alice. Hence, after Henry de Lacy died in 1311, the honour passed to Alice and Thomas; he held it in right of her until his execution in 1322. The honour was then confiscated by Edward II. His successor Edward III granted it to his mother, queen Isabella, for her life in 1327. However, she surrendered it to Edward III's queen Philippa in 1330. Successive Earls of Lancaster leased the honour from her from c. 1340 until 1348, when Edward III regained it and granted it to the 4th Earl, Henry of Grosmont, who was created Duke of Lancaster. After the duke died without a son in 1361, his lands were divided between his two daughters; the honour of Pontefract was given by the king to his daughter Blanche, the wife of John of Gaunt, one of the king's younger sons who was created Duke of Lancaster in 1363. Gaunt died in February 1399; his son Henry of Bolingbroke was denied succession to his lands by Richard II, who granted their custody to Edward, 2nd Duke of York; but later in 1399 Henry seized the throne and took back his father's lands, stipulating that the Duchy of Lancaster thereafter be private property of the monarch. This included the honour of Pontefract, which was thereafter held by the king.

References 
Notes

Citations

Bibliography

 Brown, A. L. and Henry Summerson, "Henry IV [Known as Henry Bolingbroke]", The Oxford Dictionary of National Biography (online ed., Oxford University Press, April 2020). Retrieved 19 November 2020.
Burton, Janet, The Monastic Order in Yorkshire, 1069–1215 (Cambridge: Cambridge University Press, 1999).
 Carpenter, David, "Ilbert and Robert de Lacy", Charters of William II and Henry I Project (2016). Retrieved 17 November 2020.
 Cokayne, G. E. C., Vicary Gibbs, H. A. Doubleday and Lord Howard de Walden (eds.), The Complete Peerage, 2nd ed., vol. 7 (London: The St Catherine Press, 1929).
Farrer, William (ed.), Early Yorkshire Charters, vol. 3 (Edinburgh: Ballantyne, Hanson, 1916).
 Gamble, G. G.,  "A History of Hunslet in the Later Middle Ages", in Miscellanea, pt 3, Publications of the Thoresby Society, no. 41 (Leeds: Thoresby Society, 1954), pp. 222–258.
Holmes, Richard (ed.), The Chartulary of St John of Pontefract, vol. 1, Yorkshire Archaeological Society Record Series, no. 25 (Leeds: Yorkshire Archaeological Society, 1899).
Horrox, Rosemary ,  "Edward [Edward of Langley, Edward of York], Second Duke of York", The Oxford Dictionary of National Biography (online ed., Oxford University Press, September 2004). Retrieved 19 November 2020.
Keefe, Thomas K., "Henry II", The Oxford Dictionary of National Biography (online ed., Oxford University Press, September 2004).
Le Patourel, John (ed.), Documents Relating to the Manor and Borough of Leeds, 1066–1400, Publications of the Thoresby Society, no. 45 (Leeds: Thoresby Society, 1957).
 Punshon, Mark Christopher "Government and Political Society in the West Riding of Yorkshire, 1399–1461" (unpublished PhD thesis, University of York, 2002).
Rose, Sarah Anne, "Landed Society in the Honour of Pontefract, c. 1086–1509" (unpublished PhD thesis, Lancaster University, 2009).
 Round, J. Horace, and Oswald Barron, "Feudal Baronage", in William Farrer and John Brownhill (eds.), The Victoria History of the Counties of England: Lancashire, vol. 1 (London: Archibald Constable and Co., 1906), pp. 291–375.
 Sanders, I. J., English Baronies: A Study of Their Origin and Descent, 1086–1327 (Oxford: Clarendon Press, 1960).
Sharpe, Richard, and David Carpenter, "Pontefract Priory", Charters of William II and Henry I Project (2013). Retrieved 19 November 2020.
Tout, T. F., Chapters in the Administrative History of Medieval England: The Wardrobe, the Chamber and the Small Seals, vol. 3 (Manchester: Manchester University Press, 1928).
Walker, Simon, "John [John of Gaunt], Duke of Aquitaine and Duke of Lancaster, Styled King of Castile and León", The Oxford Dictionary of National Biography (online ed., Oxford University Press, May 2008). Retrieved 19 November 2020.

Further reading
 Creighton, O. H., Castles and Landscapes: Power, Community and Fortification in Medieval England (London: Equinox, 2005).
Cruickshank, John L., "The Wapentake Courts of The Honour of Pontefract, 1427–1877", Northern History, vol. 57, no. 1 (2020), pp. 20–42.
 Ellis, A. S., "Biographical Notes on the Yorkshire Tenants Named in Domesday Book", Yorkshire Archaeological Journal , vol. 4 (1877), pp. 138–141.
 Farrer, William, "Introduction to the Yorkshire Domesday", in William Page (ed.), The Victoria History of the Counties of England: York, vol. 2 (London: St Catherine's Press, 1912), pp. 161–164.
Somerville, Robert, History of the Duchy of Lancaster, vol. 1 (London: The Chancellor and Council of the Duchy of Lancaster, 1953).
 Stinson, Marie, "The Honour of Pontefract, the Manor of Wakefield and Their Region: A Social and Economic Study c. 1270–c. 1350" (unpublished PhD thesis, University of Leeds, 1991).
 Wightman, W. E., The Lacy Family in England and Normandy, 1066–1194 (Oxford: Clarendon Press, 1966).

Honours (feudal barony)